Kato Zachlorou is a village and a community in eastern Achaea, Greece. It is built on a mountain slope on the left bank of the river Vouraikos, which forms a narrow gorge. The community consists of the villages Kato Zachlorou and Ano Zachlorou, and the Mega Spilaio monastery. In 2011 Kato Zachlorou had a population of 38 for the village, and 53 for the community. The narrow gauge Diakofto–Kalavryta Railway runs through the village.

Population

External links
 Kato Zachlorou GTP Travel Pages

See also
List of settlements in Achaea

References

Populated places in Achaea